The following teams and players took part in the men's volleyball tournament at the 1992 Summer Olympics, in Barcelona.

Algeria
The following volleyball players represented Algeria:
 El-Tayeb El-Hadj Ben Khelfallah
 Krimo Bernaoui
 Ali Dif
 Faycal Gharzouli
 Mourad Malaoui
 Adel Sennoun
 Mourad Sennoun
 Foudil Taalba
 Faycal Tellouche
 Lies Tizioualou

Brazil
The following volleyball players represented Brazil:
 Carlão
 Maurício
 Janelson
 Douglas
 Talmo
 Pampa
 Giovane
 Paulão
 Tande
 Amauri
 Jorge Edson
 Marcelo Negrão

Canada
The following volleyball players represented Canada:
 Allan Coulter
 Bradley Willock
 Christopher Frehlick
 Gino Brousseau
 Gregory Williscroft
 Marc Albert
 Kent Greves
 Kevin Boyles
 Randal Gingera
 Russell Paddock
 Terry Gagnon
 William Knight

Cuba
The following volleyball players represented Cuba:
 Félix Millán
 Freddy Brooks
 Idalberto Valdes
 Ihosvany Hernández
 Joël Despaigne
 Lazaro Beltran
 Lazaro Marin
 Nicolas Vives
 Osvaldo Hernández
 Raúl Diago
 Rodolfo Sánchez
 Abel Sarmientos

France
The following volleyball players represented France:
 Arnaud Josserand
 Christophe Meneau
 David Romann
 Éric Bouvier
 Éric Wolfer
 Laurent Chambertin
 Laurent Tillie
 Luc Marquet
 Olivier Lecat
 Olivier Rossard
 Philippe-Marie Salvan
 Rivomanantsoa Andriamaonju

Italy
The following volleyball players represented Italy:
 Andrea Gardini
 Andrea Giani
 Andrea Lucchetta
 Andrea Zorzi
 Claudio Galli
 Fabio Vullo
 Lorenzo Bernardi
 Luca Cantagalli
 Marco Bracci
 Michele Pasinato
 Paolo Tofoli
 Roberto Masciarelli

Japan
The following volleyball players represented Japan:
 Akihiko Matsuda
 Hideyuki Otake
 Junichi Kuriuzawa
 Katsuyuki Minami
 Masafumi Oura
 Masaji Ogino
 Masayuki Izumikawa
 Shigeru Aoyama
 Takashi Narita
 Tatsuya Ueta
 Yuichi Nakagaichi
 Katsumi Kawano

Netherlands
The following volleyball players represented the Netherlands:
 Edwin Benne
 Peter Blangé
 Ron Boudrie
 Henk Jan Held
 Martin van der Horst
 Marko Klok
 Olof van der Meulen
 Jan Posthuma
 Avital Selinger
 Martin Teffer
 Ronald Zoodsma
 Ron Zwerver

South Korea
The following volleyball players represented South Korea:
 Ha Jong-hwa
 Jin Chang-uk
 Gang Seong-hyeong
 Kim Byeong-seon
 Kim Se-jin
 Kim Wan-sik
 Im Do-heon
 Ma Nak-gil
 No Jin-su
 O Uk-hwan
 Park Jong-chan
 Sin Yeong-cheol

Spain
The following volleyball players represented Spain:
 Ángel Alonso
 Venancio Costa
 Jesús Garrido
 Francisco Hervás
 Héctor López
 Miguel Ángel Maroto
 Rafael Pascual
 Juan Carlos Robles
 Ernesto Rodríguez
 Francisco Sánchez
 Jesús Sánchez
 Benjamín Vicedo

Unified Team
The following volleyball players represented the Unified Team:
 Oleksandr Shadchyn
 Andrey Kuznetsov
 Dmitry Fomin
 Igor Runov
 Oleg Shatunov
 Pavel Shishkin
 Ruslan Olikhver
 Sergey Gorbunov
 Yevgeny Krasilnikov
 Yury Cherednik
 Yuriy Korov'ianskiy
 Konstantin Ushakov

United States
The following volleyball players represented the United States:
 Nick Becker
 Carlos Briceno
 Bob Ctvrtlik
 Scott Fortune
 Dan Greenbaum
 Brent Hilliard
 Bryan Ivie
 Doug Partie
 Bob Samuelson
 Eric Sato
 Jeff Stork
 Steve Timmons

References

1992